Edyta Jungowska (born 1 February 1966 in Warsaw, Poland) is a Polish theater, film and television actress.

Career 
She is graduated at Aleksander Zelwerowicz State Theatre Academy in Warsaw (1989). The first theatrical success this role of Miss Maliczewska in spectacle Zapolska, Zapolska directed by Adam Hanuszkiewicz in 1990.

In television she debuted role of Constanze Mozart in Peter Shaffer's drama Amadeus directed by Maciej Wojtyszko. She has to his credit nearly 30 roles in theatrical TV. In 1995 she first appeared in TV show Kabaret Olgi Lipińskiej, which worked to year 2000. She has gained wide popularity for his role as Bożena Van Graaf in Polish TV series Na dobre i na złe (For better and for worse).

Selected filmography

Actress 
 1984: Szaleństwa panny Ewy as Julka, Ewa's fellow
 1999–2012: Na dobre i na złe (For better and for worse) as Bożena Van Graaf
 1999: Badziewiakowie as Halina Badziewiakowa
 2004: Cudownie ocalony as Hanka
 2007: Ja wam pokażę! as Judyta
 2010–2014: Klan (Clan) as Małgorzata
 2013: 2XL as Laura Zabawska
 2019: Ojciec Mateusz as Alicja Witko (one episode)

Dubbing in Polish
 1981–1990: The Smurfs – Nat
 1993–1998: Animaniacs – Dot Warner
 1995: Toy Story – Bou
 1998–2004: The Powerpuff Girls – Buttercup
 1999: Toy Story 2 – Bou
 2001–2003: Braceface – Maria Wong
 2007: Casper's Scare School – Casper

External links 

Official profile in Filmpolski.pl database

1966 births
Actresses from Warsaw
Polish film actresses
Polish television actresses
Polish stage actresses
20th-century Polish actresses
Polish voice actresses
Living people